Ekaterina Tunguskova (born 10 May 1988) is an Uzbekistani long-distance runner. She competed at the 2016 Summer Olympics in the women's 10,000 metres race but did not finish the race.

References

1988 births
Living people
Uzbekistani female long-distance runners
Olympic athletes of Uzbekistan
Athletes (track and field) at the 2016 Summer Olympics
21st-century Uzbekistani women